Simon Brook is a British film director, mostly of documentaries.

Simon Brook is the son of fellow director Peter Brook and the actress Natasha Parry. His sister is the actress and writer Irina Brook.

Selected filmography (as director)
 The Unbearable Lightness Of Being (1988) - as assistant director
 Minus One (1991)
 Alice (short film starring Gabrielle Lazure, 1995)
 L'amazone (documentary, 1998)
 Karos d'Éthiopie, les amoureux du fleuve (television documentary, 2001)
 Brook by Brook (television documentary, 2002)
 Cleopatra's Lost City (television documentary, 2003)
 Jungle Magic (documentary, 2005)
 La légende vraie de la tour Eiffel (documentary fiction, 2005)
 Generation 68 (2008)
 Annie Nightingale: Bird on the Wireless (2011)
 Peter Brook: The Tightrope (2012)
 Indian Summer (2013)
 Hell Is Empty: All The Devils Are Here (2016)
 A Different American Dream (documentary, 2016)

References

External links
 

Living people
British film directors
French people of Jewish descent
Place of birth missing (living people)
British people of Latvian-Jewish descent
Year of birth missing (living people)
Brook family